Walid Adel Shour (born 10 June 1996) is a footballer who plays as a midfielder for  club Ahed and the Lebanon national team.

Starting his senior career at Ahed, he was loaned out to Racing Beirut for one season in 2018. Upon his return to Ahed, he helped them win the 2019 AFC Cup and the 2019 Lebanese Super Cup, before being sent on loan to Shabab Sahel in summer 2021.

Born in Sierra Leone to a Sierra Leonean mother and a Lebanese father, Shour was called up to represent Sierra Leone internationally at senior level in 2019, without making an appearance. He opted to represent Lebanon, making his senior debut in 2021.

Early life
Born in Freetown, Sierra Leone, Shour began playing at hometown club Kallon in 2010. In 2011, he moved to English club Luton Town, staying until 2014. Between 2015 and 2018, Shour played youth football in China; he was named Best Player of the 2016 China International Football League Summer Cup.

Club career

Ahed

2018–19: Loan to Racing Beirut 
On 27 July 2018, Shour signed for Lebanese Premier League side Ahed; he was sent on loan to Racing Beirut on 11 September. During his time on loan, Shour played 13 league games.

2019–2021: Return to Ahed 
Upon his return to Ahed, Shour played in the cancelled 2019–20 Lebanese Premier League. He played his first game of the 2020–21 season on 4 October 2020, as a starter in a 0–0 league draw against Bourj. Shour scored his first senior goal on 10 April 2021, helping Ahed win 2–1 against Shabab Sahel. Shour also played one game in the 2019 AFC Cup, which Ahed won.

2021–22: Loan to Shabab Sahel 
On 7 July 2021, Shour moved to Shabab Sahel on a one-year loan.

International career 
Born in Sierra Leone to a Lebanese father and a Sierra Leonean mother, Shour is eligible to represent both Sierra Leone and Lebanon internationally. He was called up to Sierra Leone's preliminary squad ahead of the first round of qualification for the 2022 FIFA World Cup, but was eventually dropped from the final selection.

Shour made his international debut for Lebanon in the 2022 World Cup third qualifying round, coming on as a 90th-minute substitute in a 0–0 away draw to the United Arab Emirates.

Career statistics

International

Honours
Ahed
 AFC Cup: 2019
 Lebanese Elite Cup: 2022
 Lebanese Super Cup: 2019

See also
 List of Lebanon international footballers born outside Lebanon

References

External links

 
 
 
 
 

1996 births
Living people
Sportspeople from Freetown
Lebanese footballers
Sierra Leonean footballers
Lebanese people of Sierra Leonean descent
Sierra Leonean people of Lebanese descent
Sportspeople of Sierra Leonean descent
Sportspeople of Lebanese descent
Association football midfielders
F.C. Kallon players
Luton Town F.C. players
Al Ahed FC players
Racing Club Beirut players
Shabab Al Sahel FC players
Lebanese Premier League players
Lebanon international footballers
Lebanese expatriate footballers
Lebanese expatriate sportspeople in England
Lebanese expatriate sportspeople in China
Sierra Leonean expatriate footballers
Sierra Leonean expatriate sportspeople in England
Sierra Leonean expatriate sportspeople in China
Expatriate footballers in England
Expatriate footballers in China
AFC Cup winning players